Kola Kub (also Romanized as Kolā Kūb; also known as Kalakāb and Kālākūb) is a village in Tabadkan Rural District, in the Central District of Mashhad County, Razavi Khorasan Province, Iran. At the 2006 census, its population was 843, in 215 families.

References 

Populated places in Mashhad County